Huey Johnson (1933 – July 12, 2020) was an American environmentalist and the founder of Resource Renewal Institute (RRI), a non-profit organization that deals with environmental sustainability. He was also the founder of The Trust for Public Land, the Grand Canyon Trust and the Environmental Liaison Center. In 2001, Johnson was awarded by the United Nations Environmental Programme the $200,000 Sasakawa Prize, considered one of the world's most important environmental awards. Huey Johnson's work in resource management has been praised by United Nations officials for having a global perspective. The United Nations has also called Johnson "a catalyst and champion for environmental protection”.

From 1978 to 1982, Johnson was appointed secretary for the California Natural Resources Agency (CNRA) during the Jerry Brown administration, after approval by the California State Senate. Johnson is known for introducing Green Plans, an integrated approach to protecting and managing natural resources, to the United States. Mr. Johnson believes that these plans are capable of managing Climate Change. Green Plans, which have been implemented in the Netherlands (Nederland), New Zealand, Sweden, and Mexico City, provide useful working models to help countries plan for a more sustainable future.

Johnson died on July 12, 2020 at the age of 87.

See also
Green Plans
Singapore Green Plan 2012
The Trust for Public Land
United Nations Environmental Programme

References

External links
 Huey Johnson: Green Planning at Nation Scale 
 

American environmentalists
1933 births
2020 deaths